Chile–Turkey relations are foreign relations between Chile and Turkey. Chile was the first country in Latin America which recognized Turkey with the Friendship Treaty, on January 30, 1926. In Santiago, there can be found the Turkish Republic Square, Atatürk College and Atatürk monument.

In 1930 the Turkish Embassy in Chile opened as the Turks rewarded the Chileans for formally recognizing their country in 1926. The Chilean embassy in Turkey opened in 1941.

In addition Turkey includes a Chile Square in Ankara inaugurated on September 18, 1970 that contains the Bernardo O'Higgins Monument. The Pablo Neruda square in Turkey was inaugurated in 2007.

Country comparison

Presidential Visits

Turkish population in Chile
According to a TV program titled 5N1K (CNN Türk), about 1,000 Turkish citizens live in Chile.

See also 
Foreign relations of Chile
Foreign relations of Turkey

References 

 
Turkey
Bilateral relations of Turkey